Cynorta is a genus from the subfamily Cosmetinae. The Genus was first described by Carl Ludwig Koch.

Taxonomy 
The type species of Cynorta is Cynorta conspersa.

Range 
The initial description of the genus was based on occurrences in Brazil, Costa Rica, Cuba, Ecuador, French Guiana, and Suriname. Recent occurrences suggest the same range to still be the case.

References

Cosmetidae